Anything but Love may refer to:
 Anything but Love, an American sitcom
 "Anything but Love" (song), by Daniel Schuhmacher
 "S.O.S. (Anything But Love)", a song by Apocalyptica